Saxl is a surname. Notable people with the surname include:

Eva Saxl (born 1921), Czech diabetes advocate
Erwin Saxl (1904–1981), American physicist and inventor
Fritz Saxl (1890–1948), Austrian art historian
Jan Saxl (1948–2020), Czech-British mathematician
Michael V. Saxl, American lawyer and politician